Pariscope was a weekly magazine available at Parisian newsstands between 1965 and 2016.

Pariscope was a moderately-priced magazine, established in 1965.  Hachette Filipacchi Médias sold the printed version of Pariscope to Reworld Media in 2014. After 51 years of publication, the final issue was published the week of 18 October 2016.

See also

References

1965 establishments in France
2016 disestablishments in France
defunct magazines published in France
film magazines published in France
French-language magazines
Lagardère Active
listings magazines
magazines disestablished in 2016
magazines established in 1965
magazines published in Paris
weekly magazines published in France